Esther Meisels (born 10 June 1995) is an Israeli professional racing cyclist, who most recently rode for UCI Women's Team . Meisels had signed for the team for the 2019 women's road cycling season, but left the team during the season due to "abusive treatment and inappropriate behaviour".

References

External links

1995 births
Living people
Israeli female cyclists
Place of birth missing (living people)